Lena Kennedy (15 June 1914 – 1 August 1986, was an English author. Her books were mostly historic romantic fiction set in and around the East End of London where she lived for all her life. Some of her books, including her autobiography, were published posthumously.

She appeared, as a subject, on the television programme This Is Your Life shortly before her death in 1986.

Biography
Lena Kennedy grew up in Hoxton and attended Gospel Street school, leaving at fourteen to work in a tailoring factory. Her father was Cornelius Erin Kennedy and her mother Margaret Murphy who were Irish immigrants from Cork. On 13 April 1938 she married Frederick George Smith and they had two children. Her first novel was published when she was sixty-four and she went on to write many best selling books.

Bibliography

Fiction
 Maggie (1979)
 Autumn Alley (1980)
 Kitty (1981)
 Nelly Kelly (1981)
 Lizzie (1983)
 Lady Penelope (1984)
 Susan (1985)
 Lily, My Lovely (1985)
 Down Our Street (1987)
 Dandelion Seed (1988)
 Eve's Apples (1989)
 Inn on the Marsh (1989)
 Owen Oliver (1990)
 Kate of Clyve Shore (collection) (1992)
 Ivy of the Angel (collection) 1993)
 Queenie's Castle (1994)

Autobiographical works
 Away to the Woods: The Autobiography of Lena Kennedy (1995)

References

1914 births
1986 deaths
Writers from London
English romantic fiction writers
English historical novelists
Women romantic fiction writers
English women novelists
20th-century English women writers
20th-century English novelists
Women historical novelists